Polo or Pulo is a barangay and former municipality within the city of Valenzuela, Philippines.  
It is located in the northern part of Valenzuela, and was an independent municipality from 1623 to 1963.

Polo experience extreme flood during rainy seasons.

Festivals
Residents celebrate its fiesta every Easter Sunday of the year.

Landmarks
Landmarks in Polo includes Pulo Barangay Hall and the Pulo Public Market. The barangay is also the location of the San Miguel Polo Brewery.

References

External links

Valenzuela, Philippines official site
Polo's official Facebook page.

Barangays of Metro Manila
Former municipalities of the Philippines
Valenzuela, Metro Manila
1623 establishments in the Philippines